Jehoahaz II of Israel ( Yəhō’āḥāz, meaning "Yahweh has held") was the eleventh king of Israel and the son of Jehu (2 Kings 10:35; 13:1). He reigned for seventeen years.

History 
William F. Albright dated his reign to 815–801 BC, while E. R. Thiele offered the dates 814–798 BC.

Biblical narrative

The account in 2 Kings states that he did evil in the sight of Yahweh, and his people followed the religious practices of the house of Jeroboam, which included the worship of a cultic pole of Asherah in Samaria. The kings of the Arameans, Hazael and Ben-hadad, prevailed over him (2 Kings 13:1–3). Jehoahaz besought the Lord for a deliverer to relieve Israel from Aramean oppression, and He provided a savior for Israel, who is not named. The Arameans were defeated, but this left Jehoahaz with an army reduced to 50 horsemen, 10 chariots and 10,000 foot soldiers.

Identity of the deliverer
The Lord ... saved them by the hand of Jeroboam the son of Joash
The Pulpit Commentary agrees that this was "probably" the case.

Adad-nirari III, King of Assyria, (812–783 BC) also made campaigns into the west (804–797 BC), and on one of these incursions captured and sacked the city of Damascus, thus removing the worst enemy of Israel's prosperity, and so he could also be considered the "deliverer".

References 

9th-century BC Kings of Israel
8th-century BC Kings of Israel
House of Jehu